Bobby Deerfield is a 1977 American romantic drama film directed by Sydney Pollack and starring Al Pacino and Marthe Keller. Based on Erich Maria Remarque's 1961 novel Heaven Has No Favorites, it is about a famous American race car driver on the European circuit who falls in love with an enigmatic Swiss woman who is terminally ill. Pacino was nominated for a Golden Globe Award for Best Actor – Motion Picture Drama. The movie uses clips from the 1976 Formula One season.

Premise
Formula One auto racer Bobby Deerfield is a calculating, control-obsessed loner who has become used to winning the checkered flag on the track. But when he witnesses a fiery crash that kills a teammate and seriously wounds a competitor, he becomes unsettled by the spectre of death.

During a visit to the survivor, Deerfield's world is further set askew when he meets Lillian Morelli (Marthe Keller), a quirky, impulsive woman racing against time.

Cast

 Al Pacino as Bobby Deerfield
 Marthe Keller as Lillian Morelli
 Anny Duperey as Lydia
 Walter McGinn as The Brother
 Romolo Valli as Uncle Luigi
 Stephan Meldegg as Karl Holtzmann
 Jaime Sánchez as Delvecchio
 Norm Nielsen as The Magician
 Mickey Knox as Tourist
 Dorothy James as Tourist
 Guido Alberti as Priest in the Garden
 Monique Lejeune as Catherine Modave
 Steve Gadler as Bertrand Modave
 Van Doude as The Flutist
 Aurora Maris as Woman in the Gas Station
 Gérard Hernandez as Carlos Del Montanaro
 Maurice Vallier as Priest
 Antonino Faà di Bruno as Vincenzo
 André Valardy as Autograph Hound
 Féodor Atkine as Tommy (as Fédor Atkine)
 Patrick Floersheim as Mario
 Bernie Pollack as Head Mechanic
 Al Silvani as Mechanic
 Isabelle de Blonay as Nurse
 Franco Ressel as Man with Dog
 Dominique Briand as Reporter

Reception

Critical response
Critics panned Bobby Deerfield as an over-the-top melodrama with a plodding story line; audiences reportedly laughed at scenes intended to be dramatic. Race-film fans, expecting another Grand Prix or Le Mans, were disappointed that the story did not play out on the race track; however, the action footage was filmed by racing cinematographers over the course of the 1976 Formula One season and featured actual drivers, including Carlos Pace, Tom Pryce, James Hunt, Patrick Depailler and Mario Andretti. Vincent Canby of The New York Times said that it "may turn out to be the year's most cynical movie made by people who know better, including Sydney Pollack, the director, and Alvin Sargent, who wrote the screenplay."

The film has a 29% on Rotten Tomatoes from 14 reviews. Time Out stated that it was a "classic example of a Hollywood director being struck down by a lethal 'art' attack as soon as he sets foot in Europe."

Box office
Bobby Deerfield grossed $9,300,000 in the United States.

Awards and nominations
 1978 Golden Globe Award Nomination for Best Motion Picture Actor, Drama (Al Pacino)

See also
 List of American films of 1977

References

External links
 
 
 
 
 

1977 films
1977 romantic drama films
American romantic drama films
Films directed by Sydney Pollack
Films based on works by Erich Maria Remarque
Warner Bros. films
American auto racing films
Films about diseases
Films based on German novels
Films with screenplays by Alvin Sargent
Films produced by Sydney Pollack
1970s English-language films
1970s American films